Be Encouraged Tour was a headlining concert tour by American recording artist, Chance the Rapper, in support of his third mixtape, Coloring Book (2016). The tour began in San Diego on April 24, 2017, and concluded in Los Angeles on October 22, 2017.

Background
Following his successful Grammy weekend, Chance took to Instagram to deliver the news with a photo of the tour dates, which spans from April through June as well as one October date. The caption in part reads, “thank YOU GUYS for everything.”

Set list 
This set list is representative of the show on April 24, 2017 in San Diego. It is not representative of all concerts for the duration of the tour.

"Angels"
"Blessings"
"Sunday Candy" (Donnie Trumpet & The Social Experiment cover)
"Pusha Man"
"Smoke Again"
"Cocoa Butter Kisses"
"Favorite Song"
"Everybody's Something"
"Waves" (Kanye West cover)
"Father Stretch My Hands" (Kanye West cover)
"Ultralight Beam"
"Juke Jam"
"Smoke Break"
"No Problem"
"Mixtape"
"All Night"
"Finish Line / Drown"
"Same Drugs"
"How Great"
"All We Got"
"Summer Friends"
"Paranoia"
"Blessings (Reprise)"

Tour dates

Cancelled shows

Notes

References

2017 concert tours
Chance the Rapper